Thomas Michael McMillan,  (born October 15, 1945) is a Canadian political scientist and former politician, the country's third-longest-serving Minister of the Environment (after John Roberts under Pierre Trudeau and Catherine McKenna under Justin Trudeau), in office from 1985 to 1988. A member of the Progressive Conservative Party of Canada, he was the Member of Parliament (MP) for Hillsborough from 1979 until 1988. McMillan is a graduate of St. Dunstan's University (now part of UPEI) and Queen's University (master's in political studies) and has a doctorate in humane letters, honoris causa, from Bridgewater State University.

Biography
Born in Charlottetown, Prince Edward Island, McMillan was first elected to the House of Commons of Canada in the 1979 general election as the Progressive Conservative Member of Parliament for Hillsborough, Prince Edward Island. He was re-elected in the 1980 and 1984 elections. He served as Deputy House Leader from 1983 to 1984 under Leader of the Opposition Brian Mulroney.

Following the Tory landslide in the 1984 general election, Mulroney appointed McMillan to Cabinet as Minister of State for tourism. A year later McMillan was named Minister of the Environment, replacing the controversial Suzanne Blais-Grenier.
As Environment Minister, McMillan spearheaded the Mulroney government's creation of five new national parks (Ellesmere Island, Pacific Rim, Bruce Peninsula, Gwaii Haanas, and Grasslands); ushered through Parliament the first comprehensive Canadian federal environmental law in almost two decades (the Canadian Environmental Protection Act, aka CEPA); overhauled the Canadian National Parks Act, the first time in half a century; launched a major national program to combat acid rain from all sources (both industry and transportation); slashed allowable motor-vehicle nitrogen oxide exhaust emission levels in Canada; outlawed lead in motor vehicle gasoline; assembled, and then chaired, in 1987, the world conference that produced the milestone Montreal Protocol on Substances that Deplete the Ozone Layer, described by then-United Nations Secretary-General Kofi Annan as "perhaps the single most successful international agreement to date." He also hosted the landmark 1988 World Climate Change Conference, in Toronto. In the spring of 1988, McMillan was Graves Lecturer and Hoyt Fellow at Yale University, New Haven, Connecticut

For McMillan's national and global environmental leadership, he was named by Outdoor Canada magazine, in 1990, one of three people who, in the previous decade, "did the most to protect Canada's natural environment;" the U.S. Sierra Club bestowed on him, in 1988, its prestigious Edgar Wayburn Award; he received, also in 1988, the Canadian Governor General's Conservation Award; and, in 1992, he was awarded the Governor General's Canada Medal for "distinguished service to Canada." In the autumn of 1990, McMillan was Distinguished Lecturer, Distinguished Lecturer Series, International Institute for Protected Areas Management, at the Universities of both Alberta and Calgary. In June 2019, at its annual Gala Awards Dinner, Corporate Knights ("The Company for Clean Capitalism," which represents Fortune 500-type companies committed to sustainable development) bestowed on McMillan its Award of Distinction for his pivotal role in the Montreal Protocol.

After leaving the Environment portfolio, he remained active in international, national, and local issues alike, including built heritage preservation. When in 1981 an historic bank building in his riding was demolished,  there was an outcry from concerned citizens, among them McMillan. He summed up the loss of this historic structure, "The actions of the Canadian Imperial Bank of Commerce in Charlottetown have been decidedly more imperial than Canadian." He became increasingly active in such preservation causes in Prince Edward Island. These included the restoration of a unique pre-Confederation brick powder magazine—located in Brighton Compound in Charlottetown—the demolition of which the Canadian Army had begun until McMillan led a public campaign to stop it.

McMillan remained Environment minister until he was defeated in the 1988 general election due to opposition to the Canada–United States Free Trade Agreement among his constituents. In August 1989, McMillan was appointed Canada's consul-general to Boston.
The first person ever appointed from Atlantic Canada as Canadian Consul General to New England, at Boston,  McMillan was awarded an honorary doctorate by Bridgewater State University in 1993 for—in the words of its president, Dr. Adrian Tinsley -- "significant accomplishment on behalf of Canada in support of strong, enduring Canadian-American cooperation and ties." He maintained his involvement in politics, and attempted unsuccessfully to regain his seat in the 1993 general election. At the urging of the new Progressive Conservative Party leader, Jean Charest, a close friend and former Mulroney government Cabinet colleague, McMillan reluctantly attempted another comeback, this time in the 1997 general election, in the riding of Peterborough, Ontario. But he was defeated by Liberal candidate Peter Adams and (very narrowly) by the Reform Party's Nancy Branscombe.

Prior to entering electoral politics, in the late 1970s, McMillan was, successively, Policy Secretary to Rt. Hon. Robert L. Stanfield, Leader of the Official Opposition in the Canadian House of Commons; an executive officer of the Ontario Human Rights Commission; and Senior Research Associate of the national Commission on Canadian Studies, established by the Association of Universities and Colleges of Canada (AUCC). Among his many publications is, with other authors, Tom Symons: A Canadian Life (Ottawa University Press: 2011),the professional biography of Trent University's founding president, edited by historian Dr.Ralph Heintzman. Among private sector and community services, McMillan has been chairman of the Book and Periodical Development Council of Canada and headed the Canadian Chamber of Commerce Task Force on the Environment and Economy.

McMillan wrote a book, part memoir and part political analysis, entitled Not My Party: The Rise and Fall of Canadian Tories from Robert Stanfield to Stephen Harper'', published by Nimbus Publishing in 2016.

McMillan has three daughters, resides in Boston, as a permanent resident of the United States, but retains his Canadian citizenship and continues to be active in Canadian and American issues as a university lecturer, writer, and consultant.

Archives 
There is a Tom McMillan fonds at Library and Archives Canada.

Electoral record

References

External links
 

1945 births
Canadian diplomats
Canadian political scientists
Living people
Members of the House of Commons of Canada from Prince Edward Island
Members of the King's Privy Council for Canada
People from Charlottetown
Progressive Conservative Party of Canada MPs
Members of the 24th Canadian Ministry